Neqab (also Romanized as Neqāb) is a village in Nashtifan Rural District, in the Central District of Khaf County, Razavi Khorasan Province, Iran. At the 2006 census, its population was 136, in 27 families.

References 

Populated places in Khaf County